Bradford Saepele "Sae" Tautu (born June 30, 1992) is an American football linebacker who is currently a free agent. He played college football at Brigham Young.

Professional career
Tautu signed with the New Orleans Saints as an undrafted free agent on May 1, 2017. He was waived/injured on August 1, 2017 and placed on injured reserve after suffering an MCL sprain. He was released on August 12, 2017. On January 8, 2018, Tautu signed a reserve/future contract with the Saints. He was waived on May 8, 2018.

References

External links
BYU Cougars Bio
New Orleans Saints Bio

1992 births
Living people
Players of American football from Utah
People from American Fork, Utah
American people of Polynesian descent
21st-century Mormon missionaries
American football defensive ends
BYU Cougars football players
New Orleans Saints players